Tell Ashtara is an archaeological mound south of Damascus. The Bronze Age city that once stood here may have been mentioned in the Amarna letters correspondence of 1350 BC as Aštartu, and is usually identified with the Biblical city of Ashtaroth.

Aštartu in Egyptian texts

Aštartu is only referenced in two of the 382-letter Amarna corpus, in letters EA 256 and EA 197 (EA stands for 'el-Amarna').

EA 197 is catalogued as "Biryawaza's plight". Biryawaza was the mayor of Damascus, called Dimasqu in the letters' Akkadian.

EA 256 is a story concerning Mutbaal, the son of Labaya, and the Habiru, in regard to the whereabouts of Ayyab, who may be in Pihilu, modern day Pella, Jordan, and is a letter of intrigue, catalogued as "Oaths and denials", and lists 7 cities located in the Golan area.

Ayyab was the king of Aštartu. He authored of one surviving letter to the Egyptian pharaoh, listed as EA 364.

Aštartu is mentioned in the Annals of Thutmose III at the Temple of Karnak as 'Astarot, which Emmanuel de Rougé and Ludwig Borchardt identify with Biblical Ashtaroth and which Tomkins and Gaston Maspero identify with Tell Ashtarah.

Ashteroth in the Assyrian relief 
Ashteroth (Tell Ashtara) is mentioned in the Assyrian relief in 730/727 BC, stored in the British Museum. It is a town where Levites lived. It is mentioned twice in the cuneiform Amarna letters from Tell el-Amarna in 1350 BC. The relief depicts the Assyrians removing the people from Ashteroth in 730–727 BC. The relief was excavated at Nimrud by Sir Austen Henry Layard in 1851. The name Ashteroth is inscribed in cuneiform  script on the top of the relief. The king in the lower register is Tiglath-pileser III. This is the first exile of the people out of Israel into Assyria. This event is mentioned in the Bible in 2 Kings 15:29. (“In the days of Pekah king of Israel came Tiglath-pileser king of Assyria, and took Ijon, and Abel-beth-maachah, and Janoah, and Kedesh, and Hazor, and Gilead, and Galilee, all the land of Naphtali, and carried them captive to Assyria.”) 

The Assyrians came back in 722/721 BC and removed the 10 tribes of Israel out of Israel and brought them to Assyria. This relief is hugely important because it shows the beginning of the exile of the 10 tribes of Israel. They never returned. You can see a mound below the town in the relief. That means there was a tell below the town. A tell is where the town is built on top of the previous demolished buildings and pottery etc. The floppy turbans and pointed shoes and the style of the cloaks are typical for Israel at that period. You can see that the same clothes are shown on the Black Obelisk of Shalmaneser III, which is very close to it in the Assyrian section of the British Museum in London. The Black Obelisk is dated to about 825 BC. It was also excavated at Nimrud by Sir Austen Henry Layard in 1848. It shows king Jehu of Israel (or his representative) offering tribute to Shalmaneser III on the second register down. The clothes are the same as on the Ashteroth relief.

See also
Ashteroth Karnaim, initially simply Karnaim, a Biblical city who annexed the name of its neighbour, the city of Ashteroth
Ayyab, mayor of Aštartu
Shutu (for the name "Ayyab")
Aram Damascus

References

Moran, William L. The Amarna Letters. Johns Hopkins University Press, 1987, 1992. (softcover)

Canaanite cities
Amarna letters locations
Former populated places in Syria
Iron Age sites in Syria
Archaeological sites in Daraa Governorate
Kingdom of Israel (Samaria)
House of Pekah